A royal governor is a gubernatorial official, appointed by a king or other monarch, and may refer to:
 Colonial government in the Thirteen Colonies
 Governor
 Governor-General
 Viceroy
 During the Kingdom of Hawaii:
Royal Governor of Oahu
Royal Governor of Kauai
Royal Governor of Maui
Royal Governor of Hawaii